2 Mai ("May 2") (according to the Socialist Republic of Romania records) or Două Mai (according to the founding decree signed by Mihail Kogălniceanu in 1887) is a village in the Limanu commune, Constanța County, Dobrogea, Romania. Doi Mai is also a summer vacation destination.

Its name (then Două Mai ) was chosen to celebrate 2 May 1864, when Domnitor Alexandru Ioan Cuza dissolved the Legislative Assembly (Adunarea Legislativă) of the United Principalities of Moldavia and Wallachia to promote his reforms. Nine years earlier Northern Dobruja was given to Romania through the treaty of Berlin after it had been taken from the Ottoman Empire at the end of the Russo-Turkish War of 1877–1878.

Russian voluntary eunuchs of the Old Believers sect, being persecuted in their homeland of the Russian Empire, found refuge here in the 19th century, amongst the Greek fishermen, Romanian shepherds and Tatar horse breeders, which had huts and rudimentary houses in the area.

References

Seaside resorts in Romania
Populated places established in 1887